San Justo de la Vega is a municipality located in the province of León, Castile and León, northern Spain.  (data from INE), the municipality has a population of 2,054 inhabitants. The town is crossed by the León-Monforte de Lemos railway.

References

Municipalities in the Province of León